is a railway station in the town of Yabuki, Fukushima Prefecture, Japan operated by East Japan Railway Company (JR East).

Lines
Yabuki Station is served by the Tōhoku Main Line, and is located 203.4 rail kilometers from the official starting point of the line at Tokyo Station.

Station layout
The station has one island platform and two opposed side platforms connected to the station building by a footbridge. The station has a Midori no Madoguchi staffed ticket office.

Platforms

History
Yabuki Station opened on July 16, 1887. The station was absorbed into the JR East network upon the privatization of the Japanese National Railways (JNR) on April 1, 1987. A new station building was completed in October 1995.

Passenger statistics
In fiscal 2018, the station was used by an average of 1066 passengers daily (boarding passengers only).

Surrounding area
Yabuki Town Hall

Yabuki Post Office
Yabuki Culture Center

See also
 List of Railway Stations in Japan

References

External links

  

Stations of East Japan Railway Company
Railway stations in Fukushima Prefecture
Tōhoku Main Line
Railway stations in Japan opened in 1887
Yabuki, Fukushima